Cathcart may refer to:

Places

Cathcart, a place in Glasgow, Scotland
Cathcart, Eastern Cape, South Africa
Cathcart (Indianapolis, Indiana), listed on the NRHP in Indiana
Cathcart, Washington, United States
Cathcart, New South Wales, Australia
Cathcart, Victoria, Australia

People
 Cathcart (surname)
 Andrew Cathcart Bogle (1829–1890), British recipient of the Victoria Cross
 Cathcart Wason (1848–1921), New Zealand and Scotland politician
Nobles
Earl Cathcart, a title in the peerage of the United Kingdom
Charles Cathcart, 2nd Earl Cathcart, Governor General of Canada
Charles Cathcart, 9th Lord Cathcart, British soldier and politician
William Cathcart, 1st Earl Cathcart, Scottish soldier and diplomat
Family
 Clan Cathcart

Other

Colonel Cathcart, a fictional character in Catch-22
Glasgow Cathcart (disambiguation), the name of two British political constituencies
Cathcart Circle Lines, a railway route in Scotland
 Cath cart, informal name for catheterization supply cart in hospitals (parallel to "crash cart" for emergency/life support supply cart)